William Cullom (June 4, 1810 – December 6, 1896) was an American politician and a member of the United States House of Representatives.

Biography
Cullom was born on June 4, 1810, near Monticello, Kentucky, in Wayne County. He attended the public schools and studied law in Lexington, Kentucky. He was admitted to the bar, and he practiced in the courts of Kentucky and Tennessee. He moved to Carthage, Tennessee and served as a member of the Tennessee State Senate from 1843 to 1847.

Career
Elected as a Whig to the Thirty-second Congress by Tennessee's 8th congressional district, and to the Thirty-third Congress by Tennessee's 4th congressional district, he served from March 4, 1851, to March 3, 1855. He was an unsuccessful candidate for renomination in 1854 to the Thirty-fourth Congress.

Cullom was appointed the Clerk of the United States House of Representatives in the Thirty-fourth Congress, and he served from February 4, 1856, to December 6, 1857. During the debate on secession, Cullom stumped Tennessee in favor of remaining in the Union but when Tennessee finally seceded, he grudgingly supported the decision but retired to his home at Carthage and did not take a prominent role supporting either side. Both sides viewed his actions with much distrust thinking he was supporting the other. After the war, he was divorced from his first wife, Virginia Ingram Cullom, and remarried to Mary Griffin.

Appointed Attorney General for the 16th Judicial Circuit in 1873, Cullom also served as a judge in Clinton for several years He resumed the practice of law and was the attorney general for the sixteenth district from 1873 to 1878.

Death
Cullom died in Clinton, Tennessee on December 6, 1896 (age 86 years, 185 days). He was interred at McAdoo Cemetery in Clinton, Tennessee, and later reinterred at Mount Olivet Cemetery at Chattanooga, Tennessee.

Notes

External links
 

Clerks of the United States House of Representatives
Tennessee state senators
1810 births
1896 deaths
Kentucky Whigs
Whig Party members of the United States House of Representatives from Tennessee
19th-century American politicians
People from Wayne County, Kentucky
People from Carthage, Tennessee
People from Clinton, Tennessee